Maxwell McHugh (born 1999) is an American competitive swimmer specializing in breaststroke events. In 2021, he won two NCAA Division I titles at the year's championships, one in the 100 yard breaststroke and one in the 200 yard breaststroke. At the 2022 NCAA Division I Championships, he won the NCAA title in the 100 yard breaststroke. He competes collegiately for the Minnesota Golden Gophers.

Background
McHugh graduated from Sevastopol High School in Sturgeon Bay, Wisconsin where he competed scholastically as part of the high school team and set a National Age Group record, overall national high school record, and national public high school record in the 100 yard breaststroke with a time of 51.62 seconds at the 2018 Wisconsin State High School Championships. In 2018, he started attending the University of Minnesota where he is majoring in psychology and competes collegiately as part of the Minnesota Golden Gophers swim team. In the summer of 2019, he was a survivor in a drive-by shooting, receiving a bullet to his right leg and recovering from the wound to return and continue competing collegiately.

McHugh has an older brother, Conner McHugh, who is also a competitive swimmer specializing in breaststroke events and who swam collegiately for the Minnesota Golden Gophers.

Career

2018–2019 collegiate season
In his freshman year, McHugh won the bronze medal in the 100 yard breaststroke at the 2019 NCAA Division I Men's Swimming and Diving Championships in Austin, Texas with a time of 50.52 seconds in the final after swimming a personal best time of 50.30 seconds in the prelims heats. For the 200 yard breaststroke, McHugh won the silver medal in 1:49.41, finishing 0.71 seconds behind the first-place finisher in the event Andrew Seliskar of the California Golden Bears.

2020–2021 collegiate season
Competing at the 2021 Big Ten Conference Championships in March 2021 in Columbus, Ohio, McHugh split a 22.40 for the breaststroke leg of the 4×50 yard medley relay, which was the fastest 50 yard breaststroke relay split in the history of the NCAA.

Later in the month, McHugh won the NCAA title in the 100 yard breaststroke at the 2021 NCAA Division I Men's Swimming and Diving Championships with a personal best time of 50.18 seconds and became the first Minnesota Golden Gopher since 1964 to win an individual NCAA title. He also won the NCAA title in the 200 yard breaststroke where he swam a personal best time of 1:49.02 to achieve the first NCAA men's title in the event for the University of Minnesota. His performances earned him the Big Ten Conference honor of "Swimmer of the Year".

2020 US Olympic Trials
At the 2020 US Olympic Trials in Omaha, Nebraska, and postponed to June 2021 due to the COVID-19 pandemic, McHugh swam a 59.93 in the prelims heats of the 100 meter breaststroke and qualified for the semifinals ranking fourth. In the semifinals later the same day, he lowered his time to a 59.68 and advanced ranking fifth to the final the following day. His times from the prelims and semifinals were both personal best times. For the final of the 100 meter breaststroke the next day, McHugh tied for seventh-place with a time of 1:00.56. Two days later McHugh competed in the prelims heats of the 200 meter breaststroke where he placed 21st overall with a time of 2:13.97. For the 2021 year, his time of 59.68 seconds ranked him in the top 30 performers in the long course 100 meter breaststroke.

2021–2022 collegiate season
McHugh earned the honor of being team captain for his senior year competing with the Minnesota Golden Gophers. In a meet against three other colleges in January 2022, McHugh won the 100 yard breaststroke with a time of 50.58 seconds, which ranked him first overall in the NCAA for the season.

2022 Big Ten Championships
In his first event of the 2022 Big Ten Conference Championships in February, the 4×50 yard medley relay, McHugh and his relay were disqualified in the final for more than one reaction time registering as negative in value, -0.01 seconds specifically. The second day, he was declared a false start, a form of disqualification, in the prelims heats of the 50 yard freestyle and was disqualified in the 4×100 yard medley relay when a swimmer other than McHugh registered a negative reaction time, -0.10 seconds by the butterfly swimmer. Pre-relay disqualification, he split a 50.51 for the breaststroke leg of the relay, which was the fastest breaststroke split out of all the finals relays. On day three, McHugh ranked third in the prelims heats of the 100 yard breaststroke with a time of 52.06 seconds and advanced to the final. He won the final with a time of 50.67 seconds, breaking the pool record of 51.54 seconds set by Ian Finnerty in 2018. He swam a 1:52.92 in the prelims heats of the 200 yard breaststroke on the fourth day, qualifying ranked first for the final with a time 0.24 seconds ahead of second-ranked swimmer Josh Matheny. Finishing the Championships with the 200 yard breaststroke, McHugh concluded his senior collegiate conference championships by defending his title in the event from the 2021 Championships, finishing first in 1:49.45 and 1.20 seconds ahead of second-place finisher and freshman Josh Matheny. His time of 1:49.45 set a new Championships record, lowering the former record set by Ian Finnerty in 2019 with a 1:50.30 by 0.85 seconds. Following his performances, swimming news outlet SwimSwam reported McHugh planned to compete for a fifth year in the collegiate system, the 2022–2023 season.

2022 NCAA Championships

On the third day of the 2022 NCAA Championships in Atlanta in March, McHugh swam a personal best time of 49.95 seconds in the prelims heats of the 100 yard breaststroke, qualifying for the final ranking first, setting a new pool record, and becoming the second American to swim the event faster than 50.00 seconds, only after Ian Finnerty. He lowered his pool record with another personal best time in the final, winning the NCAA title with a 49.90. On the fourth and final day, he ranked second across all prelims heats of the 200 yard breaststroke with a 1:50.31 and advanced to the evening final. In the 200 yard breaststroke final, he placed second with a personal best time of 1:48.76 behind Léon Marchand.

2022–2023 collegiate season
At the final Last Chance Meet of his collegiate year, held in February 2023 of his fifth year, McHugh earned an NCAA 'B' cut time of 51.56 seconds in the 100 yard breaststroke.

2023 Big Ten Championships
Approximately two weeks later, on the first day of the 2023 Big Ten Conference Championships, McHugh split a 22.57 for the breaststroke leg of the 4×50 yard medley relay to help place sixth in 1:24.21. The relay's time lowered the Minnesota Golden Gophers men's swim program record in the event by 0.04 seconds. Improving relay placing to fourth in the final of the 4×100 yard medley relay the following day, he contributed a 50.61 for the breaststroke leg to a final mark of 3:07.01. The relay time registered as the fastest for the school in the NCAA season. On the third evening, he won the gold medal in the 100 yard breaststroke in a Canham Natatorium record time of 50.80 seconds, finishing as the only swimmer faster than 51 seconds. With his win he became the second man in the history of the Big Ten Conference to win four-consecutive titles in the 100 yard breaststroke, after Ian Finnerty. The final day, he won his third-consecutive title in the 200 yard breaststroke with a time of 1:50.20, marking the third-consecutive year he won all the individual breaststroke events at the Men's Big Ten Conference Championships and setting a new school program record for the total number of individual conference titles won by any one male Golden Gophers swimmer over the course of their collegiate career at seven titles, which increased the record count by one from the previous record of six titles set in the 1960's by Steve Jackman.

Personal best times

Long course meters (50 m pool)

Short course yards (25 yd pool)

Awards and honors
 Big Ten Conference, Swimmer of the Year (Men's): 2021
 SwimSwam, Swim of the Week: January 29, 2021
 Big Ten Conference, Swimmer of the Week (Men's): December 11, 2019, January 27, 2021, February 10, 2021, December 8, 2021, February 2, 2022
 Big Ten Conference, Freshman of the Week (Men's): January 16, 2019, January 23, 2019, February 6, 2019

References

1999 births
Living people
Sportspeople from Wisconsin
People from Sturgeon Bay, Wisconsin
American male breaststroke swimmers
Minnesota Golden Gophers men's swimmers